Villa de Merlo Airport  was a public use airport serving the town of Villa de Merlo, San Luis, Argentina.

Google Earth Historical Imagery (10/28/2003) shows a  asphalt runway just south of the town. The (4/16/2010) image shows the runway converted to a street with trees planted alongside its length. Subsequent and current images show progressive construction activity.

See also

Transport in Argentina
List of airports in Argentina

References

External links 
Villa de Merlo

Defunct airports
Airports in Argentina
San Luis Province